Contactless dining is a restaurant dine-in experience that allows a guest to view the menu, place orders, and make payments without interacting closely with a server or touching shared public surfaces. The form of dining has emerged in global popularity during the COVID-19 pandemic.

It is enabled via technology such as near-field communication and QR codes, in which a restaurant customer scans a sticker to access the restaurant menu or payment system online.

While already commonplace in other countries such as China since 2013, contactless dining has only recently gained popularity in the more service-based restaurant industry of the US, in which low-wage hourly employees receive tips from customers based on their service.

Contactless dining has the benefits of quicker service, reducing contact between people, and higher margins from sales. By removing the manual ordering and billing system, the model also decreases pressure on servers, helps restaurants increase operational efficiency, and improves the dining experience for customers. This online ordering and payment system also allows customers to save their payment information and verify the accuracy of their order.

History 
In 2011, the Chinese payment platform Alipay launched a QR code payment method. In 2013, the Chinese mobile application WeChat enabled users to accept payment with QR codes. The feature only required vendors to print a QR code, which made the systems easy to adopt for restaurants. Restaurants could also enable customers to scan a QR code to order dishes directly through the menu on their phone. In 2016, more than 600,000 restaurants in China supported payments via the Alipay App. As of 2019, 93.2% of Chinese diners paid their restaurant bills through Alipay or WeChat Pay.

In the US, QR codes have been offered as a method of accessing restaurant menus or are printed onto receipts for guests to scan and access an online survey. Starbucks has deployed NFC-enabled machines for payments. However, a full system that enabled guests to place orders and make payments online while sitting at a restaurant table did not become more widely known until the COVID-19 pandemic in the US. The Centers for Disease Control and Prevention and other state restaurant associations encouraged the use of contactless payments and digital menus in their reopening guidelines for the pandemic.

In January 2020, FoodTech startup from India Digital Waiter launched a contactless dining solution in multiple countries starting from India with a wide range of features making it close to a physical dining experience. In April, India-based food delivery start-up Zomato introduced a contactless dining solution with menu-viewing, ordering, and payment functionality. In May 2020, PayPal introduced contactless QR codes for payment for a range of countries. Mobile ordering platform LevelUp partnered with point-of-sale solution provider Toast to accept QR codes for touchless pay in restaurants. In May, restaurant technology company Presto and Glyde began offering a waitlist, ordering, and pay solution for an entirely contactless dine-in experience. In July 2020, Coca-Cola launched a contactless pouring option for its drink dispensers that was adopted by Wendy's and Five Guys. Small and medium-sized restaurants have since been experimenting with a range of similar solutions to meet new public health guidelines.

Technology and Use 
Contactless dining typically consists of three digitalized components that represent each step of the traditional dine-in experience in which a restaurant guest needs to interact with a server or item, as seen in [[Glyde. Popmenu, BentoBox, Paytronix, SevenRooms, WTF - Digital Waiter™ solution: Check menu, order together, pay together, split bill, online ratings and Zomato's solution: viewing the menu, placing orders, and paying the check. Popmenu, like other restaurant tech companies, also launched its own version of contactless software that lets guests scan a QR code with their own smartphones to view and order from restaurant menus. While most contactless menu providers still stick to QR codes, NFC tags are becoming more popular way to initiate the contactless dining interaction. Some companies offer specific components, such as iWallet and Barpay that convert paper menus into QR code menus. Others like Menuflow and Beaconstac offer restaurants the option to upload PDFs or images to convert into a QR Code along with language translation and robust analytics.  Companies like Tripdairy, Presto offer contactless menus, ordering, and payments, as well as additional features that digitize the dining process further, such as digital waitlist systems, preordering options, digital guest profiles, and online surveying. Some other no-touch features include automating menu changes based on the time of day or week.  The method of speeding up the payment process via contactless payments allows for shorter meal durations and additional guests to be seated during busy periods.

References 

Restaurants
Dining